Butterworth–Juru Highway, Federal Route 1 is an alternative highway from Perai, Chai Leng Park to Kuala Lumpur in Penang, Malaysia. It is also a busy highway during rushing hours and after work hours. It is also a highway to Kulim, Kedah. This highway is connecting to Bukit Mertajam town first then only to Kulim via Jalan Kulim.

List of interchanges

Highways in Malaysia